Leila Bronia Josefowicz (born October 20, 1977) is an American-Canadian classical violinist.

Biography 
Josefowicz was born in Mississauga, Ontario, Canada. When she was a young child her family moved to Los Angeles, California, where she started studying violin at the age of three and a half using the Suzuki method. Her father, physicist Jack Josefowicz, and mother, biologist Wendy Josefowicz, learned with her. At age five she started formal lessons with Idel Low. At seven she began studies with the distinguished violin teacher Robert Lipsett at The Colburn School. Leila's parents, valuing a well-rounded education, believed that both she and her brother Steven should stay in the public school system, and Leila attended public middle and high school despite a very full schedule of music activities.

When Leila was 13 the Josefowiczes moved to Philadelphia so she could attend the prestigious Curtis Institute of Music, where she studied with Jaime Laredo, Jascha Brodsky, Felix Galimir and Joseph Gingold. Leila also attended the Julia R. Masterman School in Philadelphia while at Curtis, completing a bachelor of music degree and her high school diploma in the same year.

Career 
While still in her teens, Josefowicz played with symphony orchestras in Europe, Asia and North America, including Philadelphia, Cleveland, Los Angeles, Houston, Chicago, Boston, Montreal and Toronto.

Josefowicz made her Carnegie Hall debut in 1994 performing the Tchaikovsky Concerto with Sir Neville Marriner and the Academy of St. Martin in the Fields. 
The same year she signed an exclusive recording contract with Philips Classics, recording the Tchaikovsky and Sibelius concertos. 
Other recordings followed on Warner Classics, Nonesuch Records and Deutsche Grammophon labels that include masterworks for solo violin, recital repertoire and the concertos of Romantic and modern composers.

Josefowicz has kept a busy international schedule as a soloist, performing regularly around the world, including North and South America, Europe, Japan, China, New Zealand and Australia. She has a strong interest in jazz, improvisation, and new music.

Josefowicz is acclaimed for championing new compositions, including works by John Adams, Oliver Knussen, Thomas Adès and Luca Francesconi.  In 2008–09 she performed the world premiere of the violin concerto written for her by Esa-Pekka Salonen, for which he won the Grawemeyer Prize, with the Los Angeles Philharmonic (April 2009); Steven Mackey wrote a violin concerto for Josefowicz that was given its world premiere with the St. Louis Symphony (October 2008); and Colin Matthews wrote a concerto for her that had its world premiere with the City of Birmingham Symphony Orchestra (September 2009). In 2014 she gave the world premiere of the concerto Duende written for her by Luca Francesconi, for which he won the Royal Philharmonic Society Music Award. In 2015 she gave the world premiere of the concerto Scheherazade.2, written for Josefowicz by John Adams, with the New York Philharmonic. Josefowicz continues to play traditional masterworks and contemporary compositions with ensembles including the Chicago Symphony Orchestra (Salonen), New York City Ballet Orchestra (Salonen), San Francisco Symphony (Adams and Salonen), St. Louis Symphony Orchestra (Adès), Finnish Radio Symphony Orchestra (Matthews), New World Symphony (Adès), Royal Scottish National Orchestra (Knussen), Los Angeles Philharmonic Orchestra (Mackey), Cleveland Orchestra (Adams), Royal Concertgebouw Orchestra (Adès), Minnesota Orchestra  (Vänskä), and Atlanta Symphony Orchestra (Adès). Some of her recent and upcoming engagements in Europe include appearances with the Leipzig Gewandhaus Orchestra, the London Philharmonic Orchestra, Munich and Czech Philharmonics, and the London Symphony; performances of the new Salonen concerto in Paris, Stockholm, Lisbon and Ferrara, Italy with the composer on the podium; and a fifth appearance at the London Proms.

Josefowicz received an Avery Fisher Career Grant in 1994. In 2007 she was named a USA Cummings Fellow, United States Artists. For her advocacy of new contemporary works for the violin, Josefowicz was named a 2008 MacArthur Fellow. In 2018 she was awarded the Avery Fisher Prize

See also
 Canadian classical music
 List of people from Mississauga
List of Canadian musicians
List of contemporary classical violinists

References

External links

Leila Josefowicz – The Official Website
Cummings Foundation Fellows 2007
United States Artists Arts Advocacy Organization.
photo link

1977 births
American classical violinists
Canadian emigrants to the United States
Canadian classical violinists
Canadian people of English descent
Canadian people of Polish-Jewish descent
Jewish Canadian musicians
Living people
Musicians from Mississauga
Musicians from Los Angeles
Curtis Institute of Music alumni
MacArthur Fellows
Child classical musicians
Jewish classical violinists
Women classical violinists
21st-century American women musicians
21st-century classical violinists
20th-century Canadian violinists and fiddlers
21st-century Canadian violinists and fiddlers
Canadian women violinists and fiddlers
21st-century American violinists